2-Methylpentamethylenediamine is an organic compound part of the amine family with the formula H2NCH2CH2CH2CH(CH3)CCH2NCH2. A colorless liquid, this diamine is obtained by the hydrogenation of 2-methylglutaronitrile.

Uses 
2-Methylpentamethylenediamine can serve as a curing agent for epoxy resin systems. It gives good adhesion to metals and resistance against corrosion and other chemicals. It provides toughness, low blush, uniform finish, high gloss, and improves UV stability. It reduces gel time and is compatible with epoxy resins. It is suitable for marine, industrial, and decorative coatings. It is better known by the trade name "Dytek A".

2-Methylpentamethylenediamine can also be used as a chain extender for polyurethane applications, and in particular with PUDs. Its derivatives like aspartic esters, secondary amines,  aldimines and ketoimines serve as curatives in polyurea systems. In polyamides, 2-Methylpentamethylenediamine acts as a crystallinity disruptor. This makes polymers amorphous in structure and slows down crystallization. It lowers melting point, improves surface appearance, increases abrasion resistance, and dye uptake. It also reduces water absorption,  gelling, melt and quench temperatures.

In summary, its uses are:

 Corrosion inhibitor
 Polyamide adhesive and ink resins.
 Polyamide films, plastics, and fibers
 Epoxy curing agents
 Metalworking Fluids
 Chain extenders
 Water treatment chemicals
 Isocyanates

Hazards 
2-Methylpentamethylenediamine has many uses, but is a hazardous chemical. It can cause burns, is corrosive to skin, harmful when swallowed, and it can cause pulmonary edema and acute pneumonitis when inhaled in high concentrations.

See also 
 1,2-Diaminocyclohexane
 Hexamethylenediamine

References

External links 
 http://www.chemspider.com/Chemical-Structure.77450.html
 https://webbook.nist.gov/cgi/cbook.cgi?ID=15520-10-2

Amines